Kiran Badloe (born 13 September 1994) is a Dutch windsurfer. He won the gold medal in the men's event at the 2019 RS:X World Championships and 2020 RS:X World Championships.

In October 2020, he competed at the iQFoil International Games held at Campione, Lake Garda.

At the 2020 Summer Olympics in Tokyo, Japan, he won gold for the Netherlands in windsurfing. 

After his Olympic win, Badloe garnered media attention for the distinctive "blue colored arrow haircut" he sported during the competition. The hairstyle was an homage to the cartoon character Aang from the Avatar: The Last Airbender series. Badloe explained the show's connection to his haircut ahead of his medal race:

In March 2022, his portrait was added to a mural in the Schilderswijk neighbourhood of The Hague, Netherlands, alongside other Dutch competitors of the Summer or Winter Olympics and Paralympics held in 2021 and 2022.

References

External links 
 

1994 births
Living people
Dutch windsurfers
Dutch male sailors (sport)
Olympic sailors of the Netherlands
Olympic gold medalists for the Netherlands
Olympic medalists in sailing
Sailors at the 2020 Summer Olympics – RS:X
Medalists at the 2020 Summer Olympics
RS:X class world champions
Surinamese people of Indian descent
Surinamese Hindus
Sportspeople from Almere
21st-century Dutch people